is a shōnen manga written by Masao Yajima and illustrated by Akira Oze. The manga ran in Shōnen Sunday from 1986 vol. 39 through 1988 vol 1.

Plot
The adventure manga is about a boy who get transported in a near-future post-apocalyptic world and lead the resistance against the ruling Empire through his knowledge of present days technologies.

References 

1986 manga
Science fiction anime and manga
Shōnen manga